The Kyoto Kimpai (Japanese 京都金杯) is a Grade 3 horse race for Thoroughbreds aged four and over, run in January over a distance of 1600 metres on turf at Kyoto Racecourse.

The Kyoto Kimpai was first run in 1963 and has held Grade 3 status since 1984. The race was run at Hanshin Racecourse in 1980. It was contested over 2000 metres before being cut to 1600 metres in 2000.

Winners since 2000 

The 2020, 2021 and 2022 runnings took place at Chukyo while Kyoto was closed for redevelopment.

Earlier winners

 1984 - Long Grace
 1985 - Mejiro Thomas
 1986 - Eiko French
 1987 - Dokan Yashima
 1988 - Tamamo Cross
 1989 - Katsu Tokushin
 1990 - Osaichi George
 1991 - Daiyusaku
 1992 - White Arrow
 1993 - El Casa River
 1994 - Eishin Tennessee
 1995 - Wako Chikako
 1996 - T M Jumbo
 1997 - Ishino Sunday
 1998 - Midnight Bet
 1999 - Hikari Cermet

See also
 Horse racing in Japan
 List of Japanese flat horse races

References

Turf races in Japan